The Bläck Fööss (Ripuarian De Bläck Fööss) are a music group from Cologne, Germany, started in 1970.

Name of the band 

The band's name in Kölsch, a local dialect of Ripuarian, in which the group predominantly sings, means barefoot.
It is pronounced .
In their early days the group would perform barefoot, which was later given up mainly after several injuries from remains of broken glass on stages.

Repertoire 

The band's style of music is a cross between Schlager and pop, but they also perform songs with jazz, blues, rock and reggae styles. The group is famous for its a cappella singing. Many of the band's songs are popular carnival songs, while others are covers of bands such as Ladysmith Black Mambazo, Beatles, Hollies or Willi Ostermann.

In August 1985 the band got their biggest chart success, with the song "Frankreich, Frankreich" (France, France) landing in at number 9 in the German charts.

Band members 

In their 4 decades together, the Bläck Fööss have only had a few changes in membership. Willy Schnitzler and Rolf Lammers have both played keyboard; in 1994, the band had its biggest split, with frontman Tommy Engel leaving for a solo career after so-called creative differences.

 Karl Friedrich "Kafi" Biermann: singer, guitar, percussion (from 1995 - 2017)
 Ralph Gusovius (born March 16, 1950): drums, accordion, singer (since 1995)
 Günther "Bömmel" Lückerath (born June 20, 1948): guitar, banjo, mandolin, fiddle, vocals (founding member)
 Hartmut Priess (born 19 August 1942 in Berlin):bass, guitar, mandolin (founding member - 2018)
 Peter Schütten (born 4 August 1943 in Kiel): guitar, singing, percussion (founding member - 2017)
 Erry Stoklosa (born 25 October 1947 in the former city Porz): guitar, percussion, vocals (founding member)
 Andreas Wegener: piano, synthesizer, accordion, vocals (since 2005)
Mirko Bäumer: singer, guitar (since 2017)
Pit Hupperten: singer, guitar (since 2017)
Hanz Thodam: bass, guitar (since 2019)

Willy Schnitzler left the band in 2005 after arthritis of the hand rendered him unable to play. He was succeeded by Andreas Wegener. In January 2017 Singer Kafi Biermann and founding member Peter Schütten left the band and were succeeded by Mirko Bäumer and Pit Hupperten. Hanz Thodam replaced bass player Hartmut Priess after the band's traditional New Years Eve concert of 2018.

Discography

Literature 
 Matthias Becker: Bläck Fööss - schwatz op wiess: 124 Lieder in Wort und Bild; Texte, Hintergründe, Kommentare, Kölsch-Lexikon, Chronik, Diskografie. Gerig-Musikverlage, De Bläck-Fööss-Musikverlag, Bergisch Gladbach Bensberg, 2000, 152 Seiten, kartoniert,

See also 
King Size Dick

External links

Sources 

German musical groups
Musical groups from Cologne